Faqeerabad (Urdu: فقير آباد), also spelled as Faqirabad, is a neighbourhood of Peshawar, Khyber Pakhtunkhwa, Pakistan. Hashtnagri is located to the south while Charsadda Road is located to the west, all the way up to the northern end of Faqeerabad.

Overview 
The areas forming part of Faqeerabad are Zaryab Colony, Afghan Colony, Ashrafia Colony, Shakirabad, Zaheerabad and Shahi Bagh. The notable attractions of the Faqirabad are Shahi Bagh, Arbab Niaz Cricket Stadium, Tamas Khan Football Ground, Peshawar Gymkhana Cricket Ground, Municipal Inter college for Girls, Government college Peshawar and Peshawar Eidgah.

Since 2000, due to a surge in private educational institutes, the area is now full of private commerce colleges and private hostels built in residential areas of Faqeerabad.

Majority of the people living in the region are Pakistanis but a sizeable population of Afghans also live there. Most are Muslims with small minority are Christians, Sikhs and Hindus. Major languages are Pashto, Hindko and Persian.

Administrative Area and Census Information 

Faqeerabad is part of Pakistan National Assembly seat NA-31 (Peshawar-V) while for KP Provincial Assembly it is part of PF-1 (Peshawar-1).

According to the 1998 consensus, the population of Faqeerabad was 16,313 while the population of Shahi Bagh (also part of Faqirabad) was 18,102.

Education 
Educational institutions in Faqirabad are listed below:
 Government College Peshawar
 Frontier Institute of Management Sciences, Peshawar
 College of Physical Education and Research, Peshawar
 Municipal Inter Girls College Shahi Bagh Peshawar
 Jinnah Islamia College, Peshawar

Sports 

The notable sporting attraction of this place is the Arbab Niaz Stadium, which hosted international matches, including World Cup matches in 1987 and 1996. A small cricket ground, Peshawar Gymkhana Ground, is also located here, along with a football ground, Tehmas Khan Football Stadium.

Cricket is the most popular sport. The sport is commonplace at night during the month of Ramadan. Other popular sports include snooker, English billiards, hockey, and table tennis.

See also 
 Peshawar
 Shahi Bagh Peshawar
 Gulbahar
 Hashtnagri

References

Populated places in Peshawar District